The history of inheritance taxes in the United Kingdom has undergone significant change and mutation since their original introduction in 1694.

Duties before Finance Act 1894

Probate duty was introduced as part of the Stamps Act 1694, in order to help finance England's involvement in the War of the League of Augsburg. It originally applied to all probates of wills and letters of administration for personal estates valued greater than £20, at a fixed duty of 5 s. (one crown, or a quarter of a pound). It was converted into a graduated rate in 1780 by Lord North, as a consequence of financing British activity in the American Revolutionary War. Penalties for failing to file probate or administration documents were introduced in 1795, and accounts for calculating liability were first required in 1805. As probate and administration were unknown in Scotland, inventory duty was introduced in 1804 to provide for similar liability there. Ireland introduced probate duty separately in 1774.

Legacy duty was also imposed in 1780, initially upon receipts or discharges given with respect to a legacy. As receipts were not in practice given or required, revenues were insignificant until William Pitt the Younger reformed the regime to require executors to account for the property in question, as well as varying rates according to the type of collateral succession. Further measures and later court decisions clarified the duty's extent.

Probate and legacy duty focused on the legacy of the estate, as opposed to its devise, thus excluding real property from taxation. Neither duty captured property passing by way of settlement, which was outside the scope of probate and administration. Succession duty was introduced by William Gladstone as a measure to capture more unearned wealth at the point of succession that would not otherwise be chargeable to legacy duty. In that regard, real property was included in its scope, but only on the life interest therein, as opposed to its full market value. Leasehold interests were excluded from legacy duty, thus having them fall within the new duty.

The administration of legacy and succession duties was integrated in 1881, with the requirement that no probate or letters of administration would be granted by the Court if a court officer cannot certify that an affidavit has been filed  stating the estate's value and stamped where liability for duty is shown. Relief from legacy and succession duties at the rate of 1% was allowed on such affidavits and inventories filed and stamped, and a penalty equal to double the amount of duty due was imposed on any person failing to file them on time. Account duty was also introduced, charging certain gifts and voluntary settlements to be taxed.

Additional succession duties were introduced in 1888:

 on any successor who is the lineal issue or lineal ancestor of the predecessor, 10 s. per centum (0.5%)
 in all other cases, £1 10 s. per centum (1.5%)
 but this additional duty does not apply to interests in leaseholds passing by will or by devolution by law, nor to property subject to account duty

Corporation duty was imposed in 1885, and a temporary estate duty in 1889 (intended to last until 1896), to encompass activities which the previous duties had not captured.

Estate duty framework (1894-1949)

The succession duty's taxation of the life interest in real property, as opposed to its full capital value, was seen to be unfair to heirs of different ages, as elder heirs effectively received a life interest that was lower in value than one received by a younger heir, even when they were shares in the same property.

In his famous 1894 budget, William Harcourt further noted the unfairness of the system that had developed:

In the Finance Act 1894, estate duty replaced probate duty, account duty, certain additional succession duties, and the 1889 estate duty. It was collected in addition to the legacy duty and succession duty which still remained in effect.

With respect to real property, succession duty ceased to be calculated on the value of the life interest in the succession, being instead based on the principal value of the property after deducting the liability for related estate duty, together with expenses incurred in raising funds for paying it.

Settlement estate duty was increased to 2% by the Finance Act 1909–10, and was later abolished by the Finance Act 1914.

Estate duty was designed to be a progressive tax. It became more highly progressive over time, with the highest marginal rates fixed as follows:

 in 1907, 15% on taxable amounts over £1,000,000, where the total estate was greater than £3,000,000
 in 1910, 15% on taxable amounts over £1,000,000
 in 1914, 20% on taxable amounts over £1,000,000
 in 1919, 40% on taxable amounts over £2,000,000
 in 1930, 50% on taxable amounts over £2,000,000
 in 1939, 60% on taxable amounts over £2,000,000
 in 1940, 65% on taxable amounts over £2,000,000
 in 1946, 75% on taxable amounts over £2,000,000
 in 1949, 80% on taxable amounts over £1,000,000 (following the abolition of legacy and succession duty)

Estate duty (1949-1975)

The complexity and unfairness in how the duties were applied was discussed by Stafford Cripps in his 1949 Budget speech:

Accordingly, legacy duty and succession duty were abolished by the Finance Act 1949, followed by the repeal of corporation duty by the Finance Act 1959. The three-year period for gifts made prior to death was extended to five years by the Finance Act 1946, and then to seven years by the Finance Act 1969.

Estate duty became more progressive in scale, eventually peaking in 1969 with the highest marginal rate fixed at 85% of amounts in excess of £750,000, provided that total duty did not exceed 80% of the value of the total estate.

Capital Transfer Tax (1975-1986)

Estate duty was criticised for failing to capture the value of gifts made more than seven years before a person's death, as well as that of any property vested in trusts prior to death. In his 1974 Budget speech, Denis Healey, then Chancellor of the Exchequer, declared:

This was implemented with the passage of the Finance Act 1975, which abolished estate duty and created the capital transfer tax, with the following characteristics:

 It captured all transfers of value, not made at an arm's length basis, by which the transferor's estate was less in value after the disposition than it was before.
 Value was generally defined as "the price which the property might reasonably be expected to fetch in the open market at that time; but that price shall not be assumed to be reduced on the ground that the whole property is to be placed on the market at one and the same time."
 Transfers (in excess of specified limits, or not otherwise excluded) made during a person's lifetime were accumulated with tax assessed on a sliding scale on the total amount.
 All transfers made at death or within three years before were taxable at a separate, higher sliding scale.
 Where the transferor was domiciled in the United Kingdom, tax was chargeable on all subject property; otherwise, it was chargeable only on property situated in the UK.

CTT was reduced in scope during the Thatcher years, with the rates applicable to gifts adjusted to encourage business property to be given during a lifetime, and a ten-year accumulation period introduced to cap the effect of graduated rates.

Inheritance tax (1986 to present)

Nigel Lawson, in his 1986 Budget speech, moved to abolish the tax on lifetime gifts altogether, explaining:

This was implemented in the Finance Act 1986.

Estate on death
For IHT purposes, a person's estate includes:

the aggregate of all the property, other than excluded property and specified interests in possession, to which he is beneficially entitled;
beneficial entitlement includes the general power to dispose or charge money on any property;
except where otherwise provided, the person's liabilities must be taken into account, but it does not include liability with respect to any other tax that may arise on the transfer, and a liability incurred by a transferor shall be taken into account only to the extent that it was incurred for a consideration in money or money's worth.

Excluded property comprises:

property situated outside the United Kingdom, where the person beneficially entitled to it is an individual domiciled outside the United Kingdom;
decorations and awards granted for valour or gallant conduct, and which have never been the subject of a disposition for a consideration in money or money's worth; and
certain specified securities.

Relief is also granted, where the value of the estate is reduced with respect to specified business property, agricultural property, woodlands, certain transfers made within three years of death made at a diminished value, and certain other cases.

Chargeable transfers prior to death
Deductions will be made from an estate's nil rate band with respect to transfers of value made in excess of specified limits, other than "potentially exempt transfers" made more than seven years before the transferor's death. Transfers of value made within specified limits are known as "exempt transfers".

Transfers of value will also include gifts arising from the amount by which an asset is sold for less than it could have been sold on the open market, as for a sale from a parent to a child. Gifts can also arise where:

 a lease is granted at less than full market rent, shares in a private company are rearranged, rights in such shares are altered, or there has been agreement to act as a guarantor for someone else's debts
 transfers of value, at a loss to the donor, have been made to certain trusts
 premiums have been paid on a life insurance policy for the benefit of someone else
 the deceased ceased to have a right to a benefit from a trust or settlement

Where the value of such transfers exhausts the amount available to the nil rate band, IHT is assessed on the excess amount, to which the recipients of such transfers bear the liability to pay.

Rate of tax
Tax is assessed at 40% of the net value of the estate, after application of the nil rate band. The applicable nil rate band will depend on the date of death: if the date falls at any time from 6 August to 5 April in a given tax year, the current year's band will apply; but, where the date is after 5 April but before 6 August, and application for a grant is filed before 6 August, the prior year's band will apply.

For deaths occurring after 5 April 2012, the tax is assessed at 36%, where at least 10% of a specified baseline amount of the estate has been bequeathed as charitable gifts. For purposes of calculation, the property of the estate is separated into three components, each of which is tested to see if the charitable gifts are sufficient to qualify for the lesser rate:

 the survivorship component, comprising joint or common property that passes on death by survivorship or special destination;
 the settled property component, made up of all settled property in which the deceased had an interest in possession to which he was beneficially entitled immediately before death; and
 the general component, consisting of all other property in the estate, with the exception of that arising from gifts with reservation.

If applicable gifts meet the 10% threshold for a given component, in certain circumstances, upon election, the 36% rate applies to the whole estate. There are several options available for estates to be able to achieve that threshold, such as having the will specifying relevant gifts in terms of percentages of assets, or successors executing a deed of variation to attain the desired result.

Additional nil rate band on main residence 
In the summer budget of 2015 a new measure was outlined to reduce the burden of IHT for most families by making it easier to pass on the family home to direct descendants without a tax charge. It came into effect upon the passage of the Finance (No. 2) Act 2015, and provided for the following scheduled amounts:

 £100,000 for the 2017-18 tax year
 £125,000 for the 2018-19 tax year
 £150,000 for the 2019-20 tax year
 £175,000 for the 2020-21 tax year
 for subsequent tax years, the amount will be linked to the September–September rise in  the consumer price index

The Finance Act 2016 provided further relief in cases where all or part of the additional band could be lost, where a person had downsized to a less valuable residence or had ceased to own a residence after 8 July 2015 (and before the person has died). This is conditional upon the deceased having left that smaller residence, or assets of equivalent value, to direct descendants. These are defined as lineal descendants, spouses or civil partners of such lineal descendants, or former spouses or civil partners who have not become anyone else's spouse or civil partner.

Pre-owned assets
Effective with the 2005-06 tax year, the Finance Act 2004 introduced a retrospective income tax regime known as pre-owned asset tax (POAT) which covers transactions not made at arm's length, where a person either:

 disposes of a property, or
 contributes funds to another person to acquire a property,

and then subsequently benefits from its use.

The person liable for POAT may, while he is still alive, elect on a timely basis to have such transactions treated as gifts with reservations (thus subject to IHT) with respect to such transactions made in a given tax year.

Notes

References

Sources

Further reading

See also
 History of taxation in the United Kingdom

History of taxation in the United Kingdom
United Kingdom